Shixin Jack Hu (born November 1963) is the Senior Vice President for Academic Affairs and Provost at the University of Georgia. He is also the UGA Foundation Distinguished Professor in the School of Environmental, Civil, Agricultural, and Mechanical Engineering in the UGA College of Engineering.

Hu was previously the J. Reid and Polly Anderson Professor of Manufacturing, Professor of Mechanical Engineering, and Professor of Industrial and Operations Engineering at the University of Michigan, where he also was the Vice President for Research. He previously served as Associate Dean for Academic Affairs and Associate Dean for Research and Graduate Education in the U-M College of Engineering. His research focuses on manufacturing systems, assembly modeling, and statistical quality control.

Hu is a member of the National Academy of Engineering and serves as a member of the Executive Committee of the National Academies’ Transportation Research Board. Hu is a Fellow of the American Society of Mechanical Engineers, the Society of Manufacturing Engineers, and the International Academy for Production Engineering (CIRP).

Early life and education 

Hu was born in Changde, Hunan province, China. He obtained his B.S. degree from Tianjin University, China, in 1983. After that, he came to University of Michigan and did his graduate-level study in mechanical engineering working with Professor Shien-Ming (Sam) Wu, a specialist in modern manufacturing system. Dr. Hu earned his Ph.D. in 1990 with a dissertation "Impact of 100% measurement data on statistical process control (SPC) in automobile body assembly".

Career 
After finishing his PhD, Hu stayed at Michigan as an eight-month Postdoctoral Research Fellow from January 1991 to August 1991, and then as an Assistant Research Scientist from September 1991 to August 1995. During this period, Hu led the "ATP 2mm Project".

After joining the faculty as an Assistant Professor in 1995, he was promoted to Associate Professor with tenure and named Professor in 2002. From 2002-2006, Hu was Director of the Program in Manufacturing and the Executive Director of Michigan Interdisciplinary and Professional Engineering. He also worked on President Barack Obama’s Advanced Manufacturing Partnership, a working group advising the federal government on how to bolster American manufacturing. He was named Vice President for Research in 2015 after serving in that position in an interim capacity. As Vice President for Research, he led the development of Mcity, a public-private partnership focused on connected and automated transportation, and a campus-wide initiative on data science.

Hu was elected as a member into the National Academy of Engineering in 2015 for methods for predicting and diagnosing root causes of product quality variation in multistage assembly systems.

On July 1, 2019, he began his tenure as Senior Vice President for Academic Affairs and Provost at the University of Georgia.

Honors, awards, and distinctions 
 SME fellow (2018)
 Elected a foreign member of Chinese Academy of Engineering (2017)
 ASME Blackall Machine Tool & Gage Award (2017)
 SME Gold Medal (2017)
 Elected a member of the U.S. National Academy of Engineering (2015)
 SME/NAMRI S. M. Wu Research Implementation Award (2014)
 ASME William T. Ennor Manufacturing Technology Award (2012)
 Fellow of International Academy for Production Engineering (CIRP) (2012)
 Selected as a Big 10 Academic Alliance fellow of Academic Leadership Programs (2010)
 G. Lawton and Louise G. Johnson Professor of Engineering
 Fellow of American Society of Mechanical Engineers (2003)
 National Science Foundation CAREER Award (1996)
 Outstanding Young Manufacturing Engineer Award, Society of Manufacturing Engineers, (1993)
 Various Best Paper Awards

Leadership 
Hu has made significant contributions to the department, college and the professional societies at the national level through a wide range of service activities at the University of Michigan. At the national/international level, he has served on various committees for ASME and SME. Hu was appointed the Editor-in-Chief of SME Journal of Manufacturing Systems in 2008, and elected the chair of Scientific Committee on Assembly and Life Cycle Engineering of the International Academy for Production Research (CIRP) in 2010. Within the University of Michigan, Hu held a number of leadership positions at all levels, as Associate Department Chair, Director of Program in Manufacturing, Director/Executive Director of InterPro, Associate Dean, and interim Vice President for Research etc. Hu also served as chair or member of various committees/task forces.

As the Vice President for Research (2014-2019) at the University of Michigan, Hu had overall responsibility for nurturing the excellence and integrity of research across the UM campuses in Ann Arbor, Dearborn and Flint. The University of Michigan has an annual research expenditure of over $1.5 billion. The Office of the Vice President for Research promotes interdisciplinary research, develops and implements research policy, provides central administrative services in support of faculty research, innovation, and economic outreach, and manages activities related to research compliance and the responsible conduct of research.

As the Senior Vice President for Academic Affairs and Provost at the University of Georgia (2019–present), Hu oversees instruction, research, public service and outreach, and information technology. The vice presidents of these four areas report to him, as do the deans of UGA’s 17 schools and colleges and the campus dean of the Augusta University/UGA Medical Partnership. The Vice Provost for Academic Affairs and the Vice Provost for Diversity and Inclusion and Strategic University Initiatives, as well as associate provosts for academic fiscal affairs, academic programs, faculty affairs, global engagement, the Honors Program, and the libraries, also report to him.

References 

People from Changde
University of Michigan fellows
University of Michigan College of Engineering alumni
1963 births
Living people
Engineers from Hunan
Tianjin University alumni
University of Michigan faculty
University of Georgia faculty
Chinese emigrants to the United States
American mechanical engineers
Chinese mechanical engineers
Foreign members of the Chinese Academy of Engineering
21st-century Chinese engineers
20th-century Chinese engineers
21st-century American engineers
20th-century American engineers